Paul Bonifas (3 June 1902 – 9 November 1975) was a French actor, born in Paris.

Career
In the 1920s, while working for the French customs service, Bonifas took classes in acting at the Conservatoire de Paris in his spare time. He left with the first prize for comedy, which allowed him to join the Odéon Theatre in 1933, then the Comédie-Française in 1938.

He made his first film appearance in 1935 in a version of Dostoyevsky's Crime and Punishment, directed by Pierre Chenal.

During World War II he served as a lieutenant in the artillery, was badly wounded, and evacuated from Dunkirk with his unit. In London he joined the Free French, and worked for Radio Londres broadcasting to occupied France.

In 1942 he appeared in the film The Foreman Went to France.

In 1943 he formed "The Molière Players", who staged a repertoire of mainly Molière works in London theatres, as well as in regional towns and at French army barracks.
 
In 1944 "The Molière Players" appeared in the short film Aventure malgache directed by Alfred Hitchcock. This was written by, and based on the experiences of, Jules Francois Clermont, an actor in Bonifas' troupe working under the name of Paul Clarus, who had operated an illegal radio station Madagascar Libre in Madagascar while the island was under Vichy control.

Bonifas then appeared in a number of other British films, including Two Fathers with Bernard Miles, directed by Anthony Asquith, and had minor roles in the musicals Heaven Is Round the Corner and Champagne Charlie, the action adventure film The Man from Morocco, the comedy-drama Johnny Frenchman and the horror film Dead of Night.

Bonifas returned to France in 1946 and resumed his career in theatre, specializing in comedy, but also taking dramatic roles.

His later film career included appearances in Trapeze (1956), The Hunchback of Notre Dame (1956), Fanny (1961), Charade (1963), Greed in the Sun (1964), The Train (1964), Is Paris Burning? (1966), Triple Cross (1966), and The Return of the Tall Blond Man with One Black Shoe (1974).

Death 
Bonifas died on 9 November 1975 at Vernouillet, Yvelines, France.

Selected filmography

 Le voyage de Monsieur Perrichon (1934)
 Crime and Punishment (1935) (uncredited)
 Les Cinq Sous de Lavarède (1939) as Un marin
 The Porter from Maxim's (1939)
 The Big Blockade (1942) as Bit Part (uncredited)
 The Foreman Went to France (1942) as Prefect of Rouville
 Candlelight in Algeria (1944) as French Proprietor
 Heaven Is Round the Corner (1944) as Rostond
 English Without Tears (1944) as Monsieur Rolland
 Champagne Charlie (1944) as Targetino
 The Man from Morocco (1945) as French Mayor
 Dead of Night (1945) as French Nightclub Patron (segment "Ventriloquist's Dummy") (uncredited)
 Johnny Frenchman (1945) as Jerome
 Lisbon Story (1946) as Stephan Corelle
 Bedelia (1946) as Insurance Manager 
 Juliette, or Key of Dreams (1951) as La capitaine du cargo
 Clara de Montargis (1951)
 Pardon My French (1951) as Monsieur Bleubois
 Monsieur Fabre (1951) as Le ministre Victor Duruy
 Duel in Dakar (1951) as Le commandant
 Take Me to Paris (1951)
 The Green Glove (1952) as Inspector
 La Vérité sur Bébé Donge (1952) as Le voyageur (uncredited)
 Dans la vie tout s'arrange (1952) as Monsieur Bleubois
 Piédalu fait des miracles (1952)
 Ils sont dans les vignes (1952) as L'Américain
 Holiday for Henrietta (1952) as Le marchand de journaux (uncredited)
 Open Letter (1953) as Honoré - le peau-père
 Their Last Night (1953) as Le commissaire principal
 Frou-Frou (1955) as Le réceptionniste de l'hôtel (uncredited)
 Marie Antoinette Queen of France (1956) as Herman
 Trapeze (1956) as Paul - circus peddler (uncredited)
 La Terreur des dames (1956)
 The Hunchback of Notre Dame (1956) as Master Lecornu
 The Case of Doctor Laurent (1957) as Guillaumin
 Mademoiselle and Her Gang (1957) as La patron du bistrot
 Nous autres à Champignol (1957)
 Les Espions (1957) as Mr. Barjot (uncredited)
 Rafles sur la ville (1958) as L'inspecteur Renaud
 Les Misérables (1958) as Le médecin de l'hôpital
 En légitime défense (1958) as Le président de la cour
 The Female (1959) as L'aubergiste
 Archimède le clochard (1959) (uncredited)
 The Enemy General (1960) as Mayor
 Love and the Frenchwoman (1960) as Ginette"s father (segment "Virginité, La")
 The Gigolo (1960) (uncredited)
 The Truth (1960) as Un greffier
 Goodbye Again (1961) as Cellarman (uncredited)
 Fanny (1961) as The Postman
 Le Miracle des loups (1961) as Le chirurgien / Doctor of Louis XI
 Cause toujours, mon lapin (1961)
 Sundays and Cybele (1963) as L'épicier
 Jeff Gordon, Secret Agent (1963) as Le notaire
 The Trip to Biarritz (1963) as Bourrély
 Les Abysses (1963) as Mons. Lapeyre
 Charade (1963) as Mr. Felix
 Greed in the Sun (1964) as Dr. Magnart
 The Train (1964) as Spinet
 La Sentinelle endormie (1965) as Lanier
 Who Are You, Polly Maggoo? (1966)
 Is Paris Burning? (1966) as Mayor (uncredited)
 Triple Cross (1966) as Charlie
 Very Happy Alexander (1968) as Le garde (uncredited)
 La Promesse (1969) as Gustave
 The Christmas Tree (1969) (uncredited)
 La Horse (1970) as Un témoin lors de l'accident dela voiture
 Cold Sweat (1970) as The doctor
 Donkey Skin (1970) as Le quatrième médecin
 Love Me Strangely (1971) as Le portier de l'hôtel
 The Train (1973) as Le voisin
 Hail the Artist (1974) as Le vieil acteur
 The Return of the Tall Blond Man with One Black Shoe (1974)
 The Common Man (1975) as Le maire
 Rosebud (1975) as man with 2 CV

References
 Parts of this article are based on a translation of an article from the French Wikipedia.

External links
 
 Hitchcock's Aventure Malgache (or the True Story of DZ 91)

1902 births
1975 deaths
French male stage actors
French male film actors
Male actors from Paris
French Army officers
20th-century French male actors
French Army personnel of World War II
Free French military personnel of World War II